Cinema (formerly: Az Cinema) is a Spanish-language pay television channel owned by TV Azteca Internacional TV de Paga (TV Azteca), the channel is specialized in transmitting films from the Mexican Golden Cinema, it competes mainly with the Televisa Networks channel De Película.

References

External links 
  

Latin American cable television networks
Television networks in Mexico
Movie channels in Mexico
TV Azteca pay television networks